Aristomenis is a village and a former municipality in Messenia, Peloponnese, Greece. Since the 2011 local government reform it is part of the municipality Messini, of which it is a municipal unit. The municipal unit has an area of 90.678 km2. Population 2,459 (2011).

References

Populated places in Messenia